The 2020 Miami RedHawks football team represented Miami University in the 2020 NCAA Division I FBS football season. They were led by seventh-year head coach Chuck Martin and played their home games at Yager Stadium in Oxford, Ohio, as members of the East Division of the Mid-American Conference.

Previous season

The RedHawks finished the 2019 season 8–6, 6–2 in MAC play to finish as champions of the East Division. They represented the East Division in the MAC Championship Game where they defeated West Division champion Central Michigan to become MAC champions for the first time since 2010. They were invited to the LendingTree Bowl where they lost to Louisiana.

Preseason

Award watch lists

Listed in the order that they were released

MAC media poll

Schedule
Miami had a game scheduled against Arkansas–Pine Bluff, but it was canceled due to the COVID-19 pandemic.

Players drafted into the NFL

References

Miami
Miami RedHawks football seasons
Miami RedHawks football